David Hughes may refer to:

Arts
Dave Hughes (producer), American television producer and editor
David Hughes (illustrator), British illustrator
Dave Hughes (born 1970), Australian comedian
David Hughes (Emmerdale), fictional character in the ITV soap opera Emmerdale

Literature
David Hughes (Eos Iâl) (1794–1862), Welsh poet and publisher
David Hughes (illustrator), English artist and illustrator
David Hughes (novelist) (1930–2005), British novelist

Music
David Hughes (bass player) (born 1971), Swedish musician
David Hughes, British folk singer-songwriter and guitarist
David Hughes (musician) (born 1960), English keyboardist
David Hughes (tenor) (1925–1972), English singer
Dave Hughes (musician) (born 1981), American musician

Science
David Hughes (astronomer) (1941–2022), English astronomer specialising in comets
 4205 David Hughes, an asteroid
David Edward Hughes (1831–1900), British-born inventor, known for the microphone, and later, American academic

Sports

Cricket
David Hughes (Hertfordshire cricketer) (born 1978), Irish cricketer
David Hughes (Lancashire cricketer) (born 1947), English cricketer
David Hughes (Somerset cricketer) (born 1934), English cricketer

Football
David Hughes (American football) (born 1959), American football player
David Hughes (footballer, born 1943), English footballer
Dave Hughes (footballer) (born 1945), Australian rules footballer
David Hughes (footballer, born 1958), English footballer
David Hughes (footballer, born 1972), Welsh footballer
David Hughes (footballer, born 1978), Welsh footballer

Other sports
David Hughes (hurler) (born 1967), Irish hurler
David Hughes (sailor) (born 1978), American sailor

Other persons
David Hughes (English academic) (1753/1754–1817), principal of Jesus College, Oxford
David Hughes (priest) (1785–1850), Welsh Anglican priest
David Hughes (RAF officer) (1899–?), First World War flying ace
David Hughes (railroad executive), interim president and CEO of Amtrak, 2005–2006

See also
Ysgol David Hughes, a school in Wales named after a local philanthropist
Hughes (surname)